Big Head Eddie is the debut album by American jazz reedist Ken Vandermark, which was recorded in 1993 and released on Platypus.

Background
After moving to Chicago in 1989, Vandermark performed with Hal Russell, whom he replaced in punk jazz band The Flying Luttenbachers and free jazz NRG Ensemble. The Vandermark Quartet, with guitarist Todd Colburn, bassist Kent Kessler and drummer Michael Zerang, was his first major group. Kessler was the bassist on the NRG Ensemble since 1985. Big Head Eddie was Vandermark's first CD as a leader after some obscure recordings with Fourth Stream, Lombard Street and the duo with Curt Newton Concert for Jimmy Lyons, only released on cassette.

Reception

In his review for AllMusic, Thom Jurek states: "This is a stunning debut, and a high sign that musically everything was about to get very interesting."

The Penguin Guide to Jazz notes that "Big Head Eddie is a nifty set of tunes, sparked by Colburn's scrawling guitar lines, lurid and alive if not quite focused yet."

Track listing
All compositions by Ken Vandermark except as indicated
 "Kiss the Plow"  – 4:53
 "Exploding Note Theory" – 6:44
 "Dog Cliches" – 4:35 
 "Jack Kirby Was Ripped Off" – 5:31
 "Last Date"  – 6:27
 "Blue Coffee" (Todd Colburn) – 3:56
 "Ingrid's Napkin #29" (Michael Zerang) – 12:06
 "Courtesy Desk"  – 5:15
 "Sinner Sinner" (Kent Kessler) – 7:29
 "Not Actual Size" – 3:56

Personnel
Ken Vandermark – reeds
Todd Colburn – guitar
Kent Kessler – bass
Michael Zerang – drums

References

1993 albums
Ken Vandermark albums